St. Paul's, Bloor Street, is an Anglican church located at 227 Bloor Street East in Toronto, Ontario. The present church building, completed in 1913, was designed by E. J. Lennox in the Gothic Revival style. At , it is the largest church in the Diocese of Toronto. The building is designated under Part IV of the Ontario Heritage Act as being of cultural heritage value or interest. 

It is the regimental church of The Queen's Own Rifles of Canada.

History

Founding
In 1841, the Rev. Alexander Sanson, rector of St. John’s Church, York Mills, decided to establish an Anglican parish at the corner of Tollgate Road, now known as Bloor Street, and Yonge Street. He commissioned the architect John George Howard to begin construction. This small wooden church, known as the “little church up Yonge Street”, opened on June 12, 1842. The first rector was the Rev. Charles Matthews and the congregation originally had 100 parishioners. Tollgate Road became St. Paul's Road shortly after the church's construction.

Growth
The congregation soon outgrew this building and by 1858, construction began on a stone building, what is now called the old church, designed by brothers George Kent Radford and Edward Radford. This building was completed in 1860 with services first being held on December 9 of that year. The tower was completed in 1894.

New church
In 1907, the Rev. Canon Henry John Cody was appointed rector. Canon Cody's reputation as a skilled orator drew more members to the church and they soon needed a new building. The current sanctuary, known as the new church, broke ground in 1909. The cornerstone was laid in 1910 and the church was opened on November 30, 1913. Notable Toronto architect E. J. Lennox, who attended the church and had previously done additions to the old church in 1904, designed the new church in the Gothic Revival style. The new church originally had a seating capacity of 2500.

The church has a number of memorial plaques dedicated to parishioners who died in World War I, including Arthur Gerald Knight. Other memorials to fallen parishioners in the church include an ornate alabaster screen behind the altar and large stained glass windows unveiled by Governor-General Lord Byng of Vimy.

Cody Hall, built in memory of Canon Cody’s son Maurice who died in a canoe accident, opened in 1928. It was also designed by Lennox. It contains a large theatre-style room, classrooms, a gym and a rifle range. 

From its creation in 1933 until its boundaries were redrawn in 1966, St. Paul's was one of two churches dedicated to St. Paul the Apostle which lent its name to the St. Paul's electoral district. The other St. Paul's, St. Paul's-Avenue Road United Church and later Trinity-St. Paul's United Church, ceased to be within the boundaries of the riding in 1987.

Recent history
In 1989, the church was designated under Part IV of the Ontario Heritage Act by the City of Toronto By-Law 68-89 as being of cultural heritage value or interest.

The church underwent a renovation in 1991. The seating capacity was reduced from 2500 to 1800 as the baptismal font was moved to the front of the nave.   

In 2006, a large renovation project, known as the Nehemiah Project, was completed by Black & Moffat Architects.

Notable people
Composer Healey Willan became organist-choirmaster of the church after immigrating to Canada in 1913. He left St. Paul's for the Church of St. Mary Magdalene in 1921. Other notable past organists include Charles Peaker and Eric Robertson.

St. Paul's has been the venue of many notable funerals, including: Lady Iris Mountbatten, a great-granddaugther of Queen Victoria, in 1982; former premiers of Ontario, George A. Drew in 1973 and John Robarts in 1982; pianist Glenn Gould in 1982; Hockey Hall of Famer Charlie Conacher in 1967; and Allan Lamport, former mayor of Toronto, in 1999. The church has also been the venue of the weddings of Ralph McCreath and Myrtle Franceschini in 1946; Claude Bennett and Deborah Ferrier in 1977; Knowlton Nash and Lorraine Thomson in 1982; Robert Seguso and Carling Bassett in 1987. 

Besides Canon Cody, other notable past rectors of the church include the Rt. Rev. Bishop Robert John Renison and the Rev. William Hockin.

Pope John Paul II led a national ecumenical service at the church during his September 1984 visit to Canada. The service was attended by 2,200 members and leaders of over 30 denominations. Other notable visitors include Duke Ellington, Archbishop Desmond Tutu, multiple Archbishops of Canterbury and Princess Alexandra.

Architecture
The church was designed by prominent local architect E. J. Lennox, who himself attended the church, in the Gothic Revival style. Lennox was inspired by the Victorian English gothic works of Augustus Pugin. The original plans called for an imposing tower over the northeast entrance, but this was scrapped due to financial reasons.  

The wide east and west transepts allow two-thirds of the congregation to be seated within   of the pulpit. The height of the transepts and the chancel are equal to the nave. 

St. Paul's has a 106-stop Casavant Frères pipe organ. It was constructed in consultation with George Dixon. The organ was donated by the widow and family of Thomas Gibbs Blackstock . It was dedicated in April 1914 and first played by Healey Willan. At the time of its installation, it was the fourth-largest pipe organ in the world. The organ was cleaned and partially revoiced under the direction of John Tuttle and Alan T. Jackson in 1981.

There are three chapels in the church complex, St. Paul’s, St. George’s and the Good Shepherd.

Services
On Sundays, St. Paul's offers three services: one according to the Book of Common Prayer at 8:15 am in St. Paul's Chapel; one contemporary following the Book of Alternative Services at 9:30 am; and one classical Anglican service at 11:00 am. Throughout the week, the church offers communion on Tuesdays at 12:10 pm and a complice service on Wednesdays at 7 pm. 

The church's vision is  "a church made alive by the power of the Holy Spirit, a city made new by the gospel of Jesus Christ, and a people made whole by the grace of God." It has extensive children and youth programs, as well as offering many adult programs, along with Outreach ministries.

Today, it is the largest church in the Diocese of Toronto. Because of its size, it often functions as a pro-cathedral for large diocesan events. 
 
The incumbent rector is the Rt. Rev. Bishop Jenny Andison. Prior to becoming rector, Bishop Andison was Suffragan Bishop of York-Credit Valley.

The Queen's Own Rifles of Canada
Since 1910, St. Paul's, Bloor Street, has been the regimental church of The Queen's Own Rifles of Canada (QOR). A pew is designated for the colonel-in-chief of the regiment, presently The Queen, who was appointed when Duchess of Cornwall in 2010. Princess Alexandra, who served as colonel-in-chief from 1960–2010, visited the church on April 25, 2010, to mark the 150th anniversary of the regiment. The Cross of Sacrifice, a memorial to the fallen soldiers of the unit, stands outside the church.

See also

 List of Anglican churches in Toronto
 List of oldest buildings and structures in Toronto
 E. J. Lennox

External links 
St. Paul's, Bloor Street website

References

Paul's, Bloor Street, St.
Paul's, Bloor Street, St.
Paul's, Bloor Street, St.
Gothic Revival architecture in Toronto
Paul's, Bloor Street, St.
E. J. Lennox buildings
Paul's, Bloor Street, St.
Paul's, Bloor Street, St.
Queen's Own Rifles of Canada
City of Toronto Heritage Properties